Kafue may refer to:
Kafue River, a major river Zambia, tributary of the Zambezi
Kafue, A town in the Lusaka Province of Zambia
Kafue District, A district in the Lusaka Province of Zambia
Kafue (constituency), a parliamentary constituency in Zambia
Kafue National Park, The largest National Park in Zambia
Kafue Flats, a flood plain in Zambia
Kafue Gorge Dam, A dam in Zambia
Kafue Gorge Lower Power Station, A hydroelectric power station in Zambia
Kafue Gorge Upper Power Station, A hydroelectric power station in Zambia
Kafue Railway Bridge, A railway bridge across the Kafue River
Kafue lechwe, a species of lechwe
Kafue mole-rat, a species of rodent in the family Bathyergidae